Wheatland County Airport  is a county-owned, public-use airport located two nautical miles (4 km) northwest of the central business district of Harlowton, a city in Wheatland County, Montana, United States. It is included in the National Plan of Integrated Airport Systems for 2011–2015, which categorized it as a general aviation airport.

Although many U.S. airports use the same three-letter location identifier for the FAA and IATA, this facility is assigned HWQ by the FAA but has no designation from the IATA.

Facilities and aircraft
The airport covers an area of 160 acres (65 ha) at an elevation of 4,311 feet (1,314 m) above mean sea level. It has one runway designated 8/26 with an asphalt surface measuring 4,200 by 60 feet (1,280 x 18 m).

For the 12-month period ending July 19, 2011, the airport had 2,275 aircraft operations, an average of 189 per month: 92% general aviation, 6% air taxi, and 2% military. At that time there were 7 aircraft based at this airport: 86% single-engine, and 14% multi-engine.

References

External links

Airports in Montana
Buildings and structures in Wheatland County, Montana
Transportation in Wheatland County, Montana